Bʼutz Aj Sak Chiik, also known as Manik, (November 15, 459 – 501?), was an ajaw of the Maya city of Palenque. He took the throne on July 28, 487, reigning until 501. He was likely the brother of Ahkal Moʼ Nahb I.

Notes

Sources 

Rulers of Palenque
459 births
501 deaths
6th-century monarchs in North America